Durras North is a locality in the City of Shoalhaven in New South Wales, Australia. It lies between the Princes Highway and the Tasman Sea. It is 26 km northeast of Batemans Bay.

See also
South Durras, New South Wales

References

City of Shoalhaven
Localities in New South Wales